Jonathan Pérez Olivero (born 6 June 1982), commonly known as Jotha, is a Spanish footballer who plays for Norwegian club FK Tønsberg mainly as a right winger.

Football career
Born in Tinajo, Lanzarote, Jotha graduated through UD Las Palmas' youth system, having arrived from lowly neighbours UD Lanzarote. In January 2004, after 15 games in 2003–04's second division with the first team – with the campaign eventually ending in relegation – he moved to Real Madrid, spending almost two entire seasons with its reserves.

Jotha appeared in one match with the La Liga powerhouse: on 21 September 2004, he played three minutes in a 1–0 home win against CA Osasuna after replacing legendary Raúl.

Released in June 2006, Jotha played one season in the second level with SD Ponferradina (relegation), then continued his career in the lower leagues, mainly in his native Canary Islands. In 2008, ten years after leaving, he returned to Lanzarote in division three.

Aged 32, Jotha moved abroad for the first time in his career, signing with FK Tønsberg in the Norwegian 3. divisjon and helping to promotion. In late January 2016, following a brief spell back in his country with CD Unión Sur Yaiza, he returned to his previous club.

References

External links

1982 births
Living people
People from Lanzarote
Sportspeople from the Province of Las Palmas
Spanish footballers
Footballers from the Canary Islands
Association football wingers
La Liga players
Segunda División players
Segunda División B players
Tercera División players
UD Las Palmas Atlético players
UD Las Palmas players
Universidad de Las Palmas CF footballers
Real Madrid Castilla footballers
Real Madrid CF players
SD Ponferradina players
FK Tønsberg players
Spanish expatriate footballers
Expatriate footballers in Norway
Spanish expatriate sportspeople in Norway